Sir Frederick Dixon Dixon-Hartland, 1st Baronet,  (1 May 1832 – 1909) was an antiquary, banker and a Conservative politician who sat in the House of Commons from 1881 to 1909.

Hartland was born in a small rural village, Charlton Kings, Gloucestershire, or close to Evesham, Worcestershire the son of Nathaniel Hartland and his wife Eliza Dixon of dissenting Christian sects, termed at the time nonconformists. He was educated at nearby Cheltenham College and in London at Clapham Grammar School.
Hartland was a traveller — he published Tapographia; or a collection of tombs of royal and distinguished families, collected during a tour of Europe. He was elected Fellow of the Society of Antiquaries and a Fellow of the Royal Geographical Society in 1854. He adopted the prefix of Dixon to his surname in 1861.

In 1875, he purchased land at Middleton-on-Sea and Felpham in Sussex in addition to his other home and agricultural holding at the time The Oaklands, Charlton Kings.

In business, he was a partner in Woodbridge Lace & Co and the Uxbridge Old Bank, a bank of a main historic market town in Middlesex for which town and its many nearby parishes he was MP – Middlesex centred on today's western and central London and for most purposes was abolished in 1965. In 1891, he sold the Smithfield Bank to Birmingham and Midland Bank 

Dixon Hartland stood unsuccessfully at Hereford in 1880. He was elected as MP for Evesham the next year. He donated chancel gates and screens to St Mary's church also known as Cheltenham Minster at nearby Cheltenham. In 1885 he stood at Uxbridge with the same party and held the seat until his death in 1909.  He was a Conservative.

Dixon Hartland was a County Alderman for Middlesex in 1889, a Deputy Lieutenant for the City of London, and a justice of the peace for Gloucestershire, Worcestershire and Middlesex. He was created a baronet on 3 October 1892

In 1895 he was appointed Chairman of the Thames Conservancy. Dixon-Hartland was the first president of Fulwell Golf club in 1904. He married his second wife, 28 years his junior, in 1895 Agnes Chichester Christie. His latter-life London home was at 14 Chesham Place, Belgravia/Knightsbridge, and he died on 15 November 1909 at Glyndebourne, East Sussex.

References

External links 

1832 births
1909 deaths
Baronets in the Baronetage of the United Kingdom
Conservative Party (UK) MPs for English constituencies
UK MPs 1880–1885
UK MPs 1885–1886
UK MPs 1886–1892
UK MPs 1892–1895
UK MPs 1895–1900
UK MPs 1900–1906
UK MPs 1906–1910
Fellows of the Society of Antiquaries of London
Fellows of the Royal Geographical Society
Deputy Lieutenants of the City of London
Members of Middlesex County Council